Christian Engstrand (born November 8, 1988) is a Swedish professional ice hockey goaltender. He is currently under contract with Graz99ers of the ICE Hockey League (ICEHL).

Playing career
Engstrand has previously played for Mora IK of the HockeyAllsvenskan (Allsv). Engstrand signed for Medveščak Zagreb, a Croatian team in the KHL on August 19, 2014. After just one preseason game with Zagreb, Engstrand was released by the club on August 29, 2014.

Following a shortened stint with HC Nové Zámky, Engstrand left the club after 9 games and joined Austrian based, Graz99ers of the ICEHL.

References

External links

1988 births
Living people
AIK IF players
Fehérvár AV19 players
Almtuna IS players
Espoo Blues players
Graz 99ers players
Linköping HC players
Mora IK players
IK Oskarshamn players
IF Troja/Ljungby players
Swedish ice hockey goaltenders
HC Nové Zámky players
Sportspeople from Linköping
Swedish expatriate ice hockey people
Swedish expatriate sportspeople in Austria
Swedish expatriate sportspeople in Slovakia
Swedish expatriate sportspeople in Hungary
Expatriate ice hockey players in Austria
Expatriate ice hockey players in Hungary
Expatriate ice hockey players in Slovakia